Jérémy Leloup (born January 31, 1987) is a French professional basketball player for Orléans Loiret of the LNB Pro B.

References

1987 births
Living people
21st-century French people
Élan Béarnais players
French men's basketball players
JA Vichy players
JDA Dijon Basket players
Le Mans Sarthe Basket players
Orléans Loiret Basket players
Power forwards (basketball)
SIG Basket players
Small forwards
Sportspeople from Le Mans